The Socialist Party of the Region of Murcia (PSRM–PSOE) is the regional branch in the Region of Murcia of the Spanish Socialist Workers' Party (PSOE), main centre-left party in Spain since the 1970s. Until 1987, it was the Murcian Socialist Federation.

Electoral performance

Regional Assembly of Murcia

Cortes Generales

European Parliament

References

Murcia
Political parties in the Region of Murcia
Social democratic parties in Spain